Milmoe is a surname. Notable people with the surname include:

Caroline Milmoe (born 1963), English stage, film, and television actress
Wheeler Milmoe (1898–1972), American newspaper editor and politician